The West Moreton colonial by-election, January 1861 was a by-election held on 12 January 1861 in the electoral district of West Moreton for the Queensland Legislative Assembly.

History
On 21 December 1860, Alfred Broughton, member for West Moreton, resigned. Henry Challinor won the resulting by-election on 12 January 1861.

See also
 Members of the Queensland Legislative Assembly, 1860–1863

References

1861 elections in Australia
Queensland state by-elections
January 1861 events
1860s in Queensland